Richard Joseph Gallot, Jr., known as Rick Gallot (born April 1966), is the current president of Grambling State University and was a Democratic member of the Louisiana State Senate for District 29 In the nonpartisan blanket primary held on October 22, 2011, Gallot received 12,992 votes (50.3 percent).

Gallot, an African American born in Ruston, graduated from the historically black Grambling State University in Grambling and the Southern University Law Center of Baton Rouge. He is an inductee of the Southern Law Hall of Fame. In 2012, he succeeded the term-limited white Democratic Senator Joe McPherson.

Despite a generally liberal voting record, in 2014 Gallot was one of only two Democrats in the State Senate to vote against reforming Louisiana's payday lending laws, having sided with the payday lending industry against a grassroots campaign that supported reform.

Gallot did not seek reelection in the nonpartisan blanket primary held on October 24, 2015.

In April 2016, Gallot began serving on the Board of Directors of Cleco Corporation, an electric utility company based in Pineville, Louisiana.

Gallot was selected as president of Grambling State University and to begin his tenure, donated $20,000 to the institution noting, "I wouldn't ask anyone to do what I wouldn't do myself."

Gallot is a member of the Gamma Psi chapter of Kappa Alpha Psi fraternity.

References

External links
Louisiana House of Representatives - Rick Gallot official government website
Project Vote Smart - Representative Richard 'Rick' Gallot Jr. (LA) profile
Follow the Money - Rick Gallot
2005 2003 2000 campaign contributions

1966 births
Living people
Grambling State University alumni
Southern University Law Center alumni
Democratic Party members of the Louisiana House of Representatives
Democratic Party Louisiana state senators
Louisiana lawyers
People from Grambling, Louisiana
People from Ruston, Louisiana
African-American state legislators in Louisiana
21st-century African-American people
20th-century African-American people